Rex, derived from the Latin word for king, is a male  given name. It may refer to :
 Rex Addison, Australian architect
 Rex Andrew Alarcon (born 1970), Filipino prelate of the Roman Catholic church  
 Rex Alexander (1924–1982), American basketball and tennis coach 
 Rex Allen (1920–1999), American actor and singer
 Rex Allen, Jr. (born 1947), American singer and son of the above
 Rex Applegate (1914–1998), American military officer 
 Rex Armistead (1930–2013), American private detective  
 Rex Babin (1962–2012), American political cartoonist 
 Rex Ballard, Cinematographer
 Rex T. Barber (1917–2001), American fighter pilot
 Rex Barnes (born 1959), Canadian politician 
 Rex Barnett (born 1938), American politician, and former officer of the Missouri State Highway Patrol
 Rex Barney (1924–1997), American baseball pitcher and announcer
 Rex Barrat (1914–1974), French artist 
 Rex Battarbee (1893–1973), Australian artist 
 Rex Baxter (born 1936), American golfer 
 Rex Beach (1877–1949), American novelist and playwright
 Rex Bell (1903–1962), American actor and politician 
 Rex M. Best, American soap opera writer 
 Rex Black (born 1964), American author, software engineer and entrepreneur
 Rex Brandt (1914–2000), American artist and educator 
 Rex Briggs (born 1971), American author, analyst and researcher  
 Rex Brothers (born 1987), American baseball player
 Rex Brown (born 1964), bassist of heavy metal band Pantera
 Rex Burkhead (born 1990), American football player
 Rex Caldwell (born 1950), American golfer 
 Rex Carroll, American guitarist 
 Rex L. Carter (1925–2014), American lawyer and politician 
 Rex Cauble (1913–2003), American banker, businessman, rancher and real estate agent  
 Rex Cecil (1916–1966), American baseball player  
 Rex Chapman (born 1967), American basketball player
 Rex Chikoko, Malawian investigative journalist and media analyst 
 Rex Clark (1935–1978), Australian army officer 
 Rex Cherryman (1897–1928), American stage and screen actor
 Rex Vicat Cole (1870–1940), English painter 
 Rex Collinge (born 1935), English first-class cricketer and Royal Air Force officer
 Rex Connor (1907–1977), Australian politician
 Rex Cramphorn (1941–1991), Australian theatre director, costume designer, theatre critic, theorist and translator
 Rex Crawford (born 1932), Canadian farmer and politician 
 Rex M. Cunningham (1907–1969), American politician and World War II veteran 
 Rex Davis (1890–1951), English soldier, silent film actor and sportsman
 Rex D. Davis (1924–2008), American federal law enforcement officer
 Rex Dallas (born 1938), Australian country musician, singer, songwriter, yodeler and bush balladeer
 Rex Damschroder (born 1950), American politician
 Rex De Garis (1896–1967), Australian footballer  
 Rex de Silva (1918–2005), Ceylonese aviator 
 Rex Dockery (1942–1983), American football player and coach 
 Rex Downing (1925–2020), American child actor  
 Rex Eisen né Tod Rex Salvador, ex-guitarist of Murderdolls, Static-X and Dope
 Rex Ellsworth (1907–1997), American Thoroughbred racehorse breeder 
 Rex Enright (1901–1960), American football and basketball player, coach and college athletics administrator
 Rex Everhart (1920–2000), American actor 
 Rex Fell (1944/1945-2016), New Zealand thoroughbred horse breeder
 Rex Forehand (born 1945), American psychologist 
 Rex Forrester (1928–2001), New Zealand hunting and fishing specialist 
 Rex Frederick (born 1936), American retired basketball coach and player   
 Rex Garrod (1943–2019), English inventor and roboteer 
 Rex Garvin (1940–2013), American instrumentalist and singer-songwriter 
 Rex Gatchalian (born 1979), Filipino politician
 Rex Geard (1927–1982), Australian footballer 
 Rex Geveden (born 1962), American businessman, CEO of BWX Technologies  
 Rex Gibson (1932–2005), English academic writer 
 Rex Gildo (1939–1999), German singer
 Rex Goh (born 1951), Singaporean-Australian guitarist 
 Rex Goudie (born 1985), Canadian singer and 2005 Canadian Idol runner-up
 Rex Griffin (1912–1959), American singer-songwriter 
 Rex Grossman (born 1980), American football player
 Rex Grossman Sr. (1924–1980), American football player
 Rex Hadnot (born 1982), American football player
 Rex Harrison (1908–1990), British actor
 Rex Hartwig (born 1929), Australian tennis player 
 Rex Harvey (1946–2019), American decathlete and engineer 
 Rex Hillier (born 1956), Canadian politician
 Rex Hobcroft (born 1925), Australian pianist and music administrator
 Rex Hudler (born 1960), American baseball player
 Rex Hughes, American basketball coach
 Rex Humbard (1919–2007), American television evangelist
 Rex Hunt (born 1949), Australian television and radio personality and former football player
 Rex Hunt (governor) (born 1926), former British Governor of the Falkland Islands
 Rex Ingamells (1913–1955), Australian poet 
 Rex Ingram, disambiguation page
 Rex Jackson (1928–2011), Australian politician 
 Rex Jameson (1924–1983), English comedian and drag queen 
 Rex Lee Jim (born 1962), Native American politician
 Rex Job (1910–1999), Australian footballer 
 Rex Johns (1935–2009), Australian footballer
 Rex Johnston (1937–2019), American baseball player 
 Rex Jung, American psychologist 
 Rex Kalamian, American basketball coach 
 Rex Keeling (1943–2010), American football player 
 Rex Kern (born 1949), American football player
 Rex Kieffer Jr. (1929–2001), American politician 
 Rex Kilpatrick (1881–1955), American football player and investment banker 
 Rex King-Clark (1913–2007), English soldier, pilot, racer, photographer, author, and diarist
 Rex Kirton, New Zealand politician 
 Rex Kodippili (born 1938), Sri Lankan film actor and film director
 Rex Lassalle (born 1945), Trinidadian alternative medicine practitioner and former lieutenant 
 Rex Lawson (1938–1971), Nigerian singer, trumpeter and bandleader 
 Rex Layne (1928–2000), American heavyweight boxer 
 Rex Lease (1903–1966), American actor
 Rex Lee, disambiguation page
 Rex E. Lee (1937–1996), former U.S. Solicitor General
 Rex Lewis-Clack (born 1995), American pianist and musical prodigy
 Rex Liddy (born 1992), Australian football player  
 Rex Linn (born 1956), American actor
 Rex Makin (1925–2017), English solicitor and philanthropist from Liverpool
 Rex Marshall (1919–1983), American actor, television announcer and radio personality 
 Rex Distin Martienssen (1905–1942), South African architect 
 Rex Mason (1885–1975), New Zealand politician
 Rex Maughan (born 1936), the founder, president and CEO of Forever Living Products and Terry Labs
 Rex McCandless (1915–1992), Northern Irish motorcycle racer 
 Rex McDougall (1878–1933), English stage and film actor 
 Rex McGill (born 1949), New Zealand cricketer 
 Rex Morgan, disambiguation page
 Rex Mossop (1928–2011), Australian rugby player 
 Rex Murphy (born 1947), Canadian commentator
 Rex Nan Kivell (1898–1977), New Zealand-born British art collector 
 Rex Navarrete (born 1969), Filipino American comedian
 Rex Neame (1936–2008), English cricketer and brewer 
 Rex Nelon (1932–2000), American southern gospel musicician
 Rex Nelson, American college sports broadcaster, columnist, reporter, author, political appointee and chronicler of Arkansas history 
 Rex Nettleford (1933–2010), Jamaican scholar
 Rex Newmark (born 1984), British television personality
 Rex Norris, disambiguation page
 Rex Nutting. American journalist, economist and columnist 
 Rex O'Malley (1901–1976), English actor 
 Rex Omar, Ghanaian musician 
 Rex Orr (1923–2011), New Zealand rugby player  
 Rex Paterson (1902–1978), British agriculturalist
 Rex Patrick (born 1967), Australian politician 
 Rex Patterson (1927–2016), Australian politician 
 Rex Paul (born 1945), real name of Guyanese-born American radio journalist Kojo Nnamdi  
 Rex Pemberton (born 1983), Australian extreme sport athlete and motivational speaker
 Rex R. Perschbacher (1946–2018), American law professor 
 Rex Piano, American film director, screenwriter, TV actor and producer 
 Rex Pickett, American novelist and filmmaker 
 Rex Pierson (1891–1948), English aircraft designer 
 Rex Pilbeam (1907–1999), Australian politician 
 Rex Rabanye (1944–2010), South African jazz fusion and soulful pop musician
 Rex Rammell (born 1961), American politician and veterinarian 
 Rex Ray (1956–2015), American graphic designer 
 Rex Reason (1928–2015), American actor 
 Rex Reed (born 1938), American journalist and film critic
 Rex Richardson (born 1983), American politician
 Rex Rienits (1909–1971), Australian writer 
 Rex M. Rogers (born 1952), American author, broadcaster and televangelist 
 Rex Rudicel (1912–2000), American basketball player 
 Rex Ryan (born 1962), American football coach
 Rex Salas (born 1962), American record producer, songwriter, musical director and music arranger
 Rex Sanders (1922–2017), English military aviator 
 Rex Shelley (1930–2009), Singaporean author 
 Rex Sinquefield (born 1944), American businessman, investor and philanthropist 
 Rex Slinkard (1887–1918), American painter and teacher 
 Rex Smith (born 1955), American entertainer
 Rex Wakely Smith (1930–2013), South African rally driver and philatelist 
 Rex Solomon (born 1966), American jewelry store owner and former capella directory publisher
 Rex Stewart (1907–1967), American jazz cornetist  
 Rex Stout (1886–1975), American author
 Rex Taylor (1889–1968), American screenwriter 
 Rex Terp (born 1970), Australian rugby player
 Rex Terry (1888–1964), American banker and politician 
 Rex Tillerson (born 1952), 69th United States Secretary of State
 Rex Tilley (1929–2016), English footballer 
 Rex Townley (1904–1982), Australian politician 
 Rex Trailer (1928–2013), American television personality, broadcast pioneer, cowboy and Country and Western recording artist
 Rex Tremlett (1903–1986), British-South African mining engineer and journalist
 Rex Tso (born 1987), Hong Kong super-flyweight boxer 
 Rex Tucker (1913–1996), British television director in the 1950s and 1960s
 Rex Tucker (American football) (born 1976), American football player
 Rex Varghese, Indian bodybuilder 
 Rex Vijayan (born 1983), Indian composer, guitarist, singer, record producer and multi-instrumentalist 
 Rex A. Wade (born 1936), American historian and author 
 Rex Wailes (1901–1986), English engineer and historian on aspects of engineering history
 Rex Walheim (born 1962), American astronaut 
 Rex E. Wallace (born 1952), American linguist and classical scholar 
 Rex (born 1947), gay erotic artist
 Rex Walters (born 1970), American basketball player and coach
 Rex Warner (1905–1986), English classicist, writer and translator
 Rex Weyler (born 1947), American-Canadian author, journalist and ecologist
 Rex Whistler (1905–1944), English painter, designer and illustrator
 Rex White (born 1930), American race car driver 
 Rex Marion Whitton (1898–1981), American federal highway administrator
 Rex Williams (born 1933), English snooker and billiards player
 Rex Willis (1924–2000), Welsh rugby player 
 Rex Wilson (born 1960), New Zealand long-distance runner
 Rex Winsbury (1935–2015), English journalist and author 
 Rex Yeatman (1919–1995), English cricketer 
 Rex Yetman (1933–2009), Canadian musician 
 Rex Ziak, American writer, historian, tour guide and documentarian

Latin masculine given names
English masculine given names